Vila Andrade is one of 96 districts in the city of São Paulo, Brazil.

References

Districts of São Paulo